Night Nurse is a 1931 American pre-Code crime drama mystery film produced and distributed by Warner Bros. directed by William A. Wellman, and starring Barbara Stanwyck, Ben Lyon, Joan Blondell and Clark Gable. The film is based on the 1930 novel of the same name by Dora Macy, the pen name of Grace Perkins. The film was considered risqué at the time of its release, particularly the scenes where Stanwyck and Blondell are shown in their lingerie.
Clark Gable portrays a viciously violent chauffeur who is gradually starving two little girls to death after having already purposely run over their slightly older sister with a limousine, killing her.

Plot

Lora Hart applies for a job as a nurse trainee but is rejected when the hospital's superintendent of nurses, Miss Dillon, learns she does not have a high school diploma. After a chance encounter with the hospital's chief of staff, Dr. Arthur Bell, Hart charms him and he tells Dillon to hire her.

Lora and Miss Maloney, a fellow nurse, become roommates and best friends. After they violate curfew, Miss Dillon assigns them night duty in the emergency room. When Lora treats a bootlegger named Mortie for a gunshot wound, he persuades her to not report the wound to the police as required by law. He wants to know Lora better, but she resists him at first.

After she passes her training, Lora is hired as a private nurse for two sick children, Desney and Nanny Ritchey. She moves into the Ritchey mansion, site of frequent parties. Mrs. Ritchey, the children's socialite mother, lives in an alcoholic stupor and is infatuated with her brutish chauffeur Nick. When a drunken guest tries to molest Lora, Nick knocks him out. After Mrs. Ritchey gets soused, Nick demands that Lora pump her stomach; when she refuses, he knocks her unconscious with a telephone receiver.

The Ritchey family physician is "society doctor" and drug addict Milton Ranger. Lora is alarmed by Dr. Ranger's treatment of the children after she sees that they are being starved to death. When she is unable to persuade anyone to take her seriously, she quits and tells Dr. Bell of her suspicions. At first, he is reluctant to interfere with another doctor's patients, but eventually he advises her to return to her job to gather evidence of the children's mistreatment.

Nanny becomes so weak that Lora fears she will die. Lora is unable to get Mrs. Ritchey to show any concern. When Mortie delivers liquor to the perpetual party at the mansion, Lora sends him to get milk. He steals some from a delicatessen to allow Lora to give Nanny a milk bath, a folk remedy recommended by Mrs. Maxwell, the frightened housekeeper.

Maxwell gets drunk and confides her suspicions to Lora. Nanny and Desney have a trust fund from their late father. Nick killed their sister with his car; with Dr. Ranger's help, he is deliberately starving the girls. With their deaths, the trust fund would go to Mrs. Ritchey, and Nick plans to marry her for the money.

After being threatened by Mortie, Dr. Bell arrives and examines Nanny. When he tries to take her to the hospital, however, Nick knocks him out. Mortie stops Nick from interfering further, and Nanny's life is saved when Lora provides her an emergency blood transfusion.

The next day, Mortie gives Lora a lift in his car. When they pass several police cars, Mortie tells Lora that Nick will not be arrested because he told his criminal associates of his dislike for him. An ambulance delivers a corpse dressed in a chauffeur's uniform to the hospital's morgue.

Cast
 Barbara Stanwyck as Lora Hart 
 Ben Lyon as Mortie
 Joan Blondell as B. Maloney
 Clark Gable as Nick
 Blanche Friderici as Mrs. Maxwell
 Charlotte Merriam as Mrs. Ritchey 
 Charles Winninger as Dr. Arthur Bell
 Edward J. Nugent as Eagan
 Vera Lewis as Miss Dillon
 Ralf Harolde as Dr. Milton Ranger
 Walter McGrail as Mack
 Allan Lane as Intern
 Willie Fung as Hospital Patient 
 Jim Farley as Policeman (uncredited)
 Marcia Mae Jones as Nanny Ritchey

Production
According to Robert Osborne, on Turner Classic Movies, the part of "Nick the Chauffeur" was originally intended for James Cagney, but his success in The Public Enemy prevented his accepting a supporting role, paving the way for Gable.

Reception
In July 1931, Time magazine highly praised the film and mentioned that it was well photographed, directed and acted and that the quality of the filmed story surpassed that in the original novel. The New York Times called it exciting "at times."

According to Variety, "Night Nurse is a conglomeration of exaggerations, often bordering on serial dramatics...What legitimate performances crop up in the footage seem to belong to Joan Blondell and Charlie Winninger as the hospital head. Stanwyck plays her dancehall type of a girl on one note throughout and is shy of shading to lend her performance some color."

In a 21st-century review, Eric Allen Hatch, writing for the Baltimore City Paper, said "watching [Stanwyck, Blondell, and Gable] in very early roles holds much of the appeal here, although the plot still works; a modern viewing of the film yields half high-camp value and half successful drama. Wellman would later strike gold with such films as Beau Geste (1939), but his salacious Night Nurse and hyperviolent Public Enemy were often cited in the creation of Hollywood's self-censoring Production Code. As a result of that code, this film boasts a much higher undressing-nurse-to-running-time ratio than most American films released between five and 25 years later."

Preservation status
A print is held by the Library of Congress, in the collection since the 1970s.

Home media
The film has been released on videotape and DVD.

References

External links
 
 
 
  1893-1993

1931 films
1931 crime drama films
American black-and-white films
American crime drama films
1930s English-language films
Films based on American novels
Films directed by William A. Wellman
Medical-themed films
Warner Bros. films
Films about nurses
1930s American films